The 1960 Arizona gubernatorial election took place on November 8, 1960. Incumbent governor Paul Fannin ran for reelection against former Democratic state representative Lee Ackerman in the general election, easily winning a second term. Fannin was sworn in to his second term on January 3, 1961. Both candidates ran unopposed in their respective party's primary.

Republican primary

Candidates
 Paul Fannin, incumbent governor

Democratic primary

Candidates
 Lee Ackerman, former state representative

General election

Results

References

1960
1960 United States gubernatorial elections
Gubernatorial
November 1960 events in the United States